Endeavour River National Park is a national park in Queensland, Australia, gazetted to protect and preserve some of the natural and cultural resources in and around the mouth of the Endeavour River, immediately north of the small town of Cooktown.

Naturalists Joseph Banks and Daniel Solander collected specimens of local 'Australian' flora in 1770 from this area which were taken back to the Royal Botanic Gardens in England. Sydney Parkinson first illustrated local Australian Aboriginal people encountered nearby, plus flora collected and fauna seen; and kangaroos were first given their modern English name (borrowing from the local Guugu Yimithirr language).

HM Bark Endeavour, under the command of Lieutenant James Cook, had struck reefs and been pulled ashore for repairs along the river locally known within Guugu Yimithirr as Wabalumbaal, possibly near the present site of Cooktown. The river was renamed on James Cook's charts as the Endeavour River, after Endeavour, and the current National Park appears, in turn, to be named after the river.

The present National Park contains coastal dunes, freshwater wetlands, mangrove forests, heathlands, tropical woodlands and the estuary plus parts of the Endeavour River catchment. It is mostly accessible by boat only, and still contains flora and fauna species of the kind collected and illustrated back in 1770.

See also

 Captain Cook mythology: Australia
 Protected areas of Queensland

References

External links
 Map showing area and location of Endeavour River National Park near Cooktown

National parks of Far North Queensland
Protected areas established in 1975
1975 establishments in Australia